Year 872 (DCCCLXXII) was a leap year starting on Tuesday (link will display the full calendar) of the Julian calendar.

Events 
 By place 
 Europe 
 Sancho III Mitarra (or Menditarra) becomes the founder and first 'king' of the independent Duchy of Gascony, with loose ties to the Frankish Kingdom.
 May 18 – After his successful campaign against the Saracens, Louis II is crowned as Roman Emperor ("Emperor of the Franks") for the second time and converts the Muwalladun, and the Arab elite.
 18 July (traditional date) – Battle of Hafrsfjord: Norse chieftain Harald Fairhair wins a great naval victory at Hafrsfjord, outside Stavanger. He becomes (at age 18) the first king of Norway. Harald's conquests and taxation system lead many Viking chiefs and their followers to emigrate to the British Isles, and (later) to Iceland.

 Britain 
 Autumn – The Great Heathen Army returns to Northumbria, to put down a rebellion at York. King Ecgberht I and his archbishop, Wulfhere, are expelled by the Northumbrians and flee to Mercia.  
 The Danes, led by Halfdan and Guthrum, establish a winter quarter at Torksey in the Kingdom of Lindsey (now part of Lincolnshire). King Burgred pays tribute (Danegeld) in return for 'peace'.
 King Artgal of Strathclyde is slain, through the connivance of King Constantine I of Alba (modern Scotland) and his Viking allies. Artgal's son, Run, succeeds to the Strathclyde throne.

 Arabian Empire 
 The Zanj Rebellion: The Zanj (black slaves from East Africa) defeat the Abbasid forces, led by caliphal regent Al-Muwaffaq (brother of caliph Al-Mu'tamid). Hostilities in Mesopotamia (Southern Iraq) will preoccupy Al-Muwaffaq, and the Zanj will remain on the offensive over the next several years.
 In Egypt, the first hospital (bimaristan) is built in Cairo by the Abbasid governor, Ahmad ibn Tulun. Physician licensure becomes mandatory in the Abbasid Caliphate.

 Japan 
 Fujiwara no Yoshifusa, Japanese regent (sesshō), dies at his native Kyoto, having ruled since 858. He is succeeded as head of the Fujiwara clan by his son Fujiwara no Mototsune.

 By topic 

 Religion 
 December 14 – Pope Adrian II dies (at age 80), after a 5-year reign. He is succeeded by John VIII, as the 107th pope of Rome.

Births 
 Abaoji, ruler (khagan) of the Khitan Empire (d. 926)
 Al-Farabi, Muslim philosopher (approximate date)
 Huo Yanwei, Chinese general (d. 928)
 Ibn Durustawayh, Persian grammarian, lexicographer and student of the Quran and hadith (d. 958)
 Ki no Tsurayuki, Japanese writer and poet (d. 945) 
 Pietro II Candiano, doge of Venice (approximate date)

Deaths 
 April 2 – Muflih al-Turki, Abbasid general
 December 14 – Adrian II, pope of Rome (b. 792)
 Artgal, king of Strathclyde (Scotland)
 Athanasius I, bishop of Naples (b. 830)
 Cenn Fáelad hua Mugthigirn, king of Munster (Ireland)
 Chrysocheir, leader of the Paulicians (or 878)
 Fujiwara no Yoshifusa, Japanese regent (b. 804)
 Ibrahim ibn Ya'qub al-Juzajani, Muslim hadith scholar
 Ivar the Boneless, Viking chief (approximate date)
 Sargis, patriarch of the Church of the East
 Zhang Yichao, general of the Tang Dynasty
 general of the Tang Dynasty (b. 785)

References

Sources